Lalandos was a town of ancient Phrygia, inhabited during Roman times.

Its site is located near Yozgat Ören in Asiatic Turkey.

References

Populated places in Phrygia
Former populated places in Turkey
Roman towns and cities in Turkey
History of Afyonkarahisar Province
Emirdağ District